Kathleen Teresa Ganley  (born 1978) is a Canadian lawyer and politician who was elected in the 2019 Alberta general election to represent the electoral district of Calgary-Mountain View in the 30th Alberta Legislature. She was previously elected in 2015 to represent Calgary-Buffalo in the 29th Legislature. She is a member of the New Democratic Party of Alberta. On May 24, 2015 she was sworn in as the Minister of Justice and Minister of Aboriginal Affairs for the province of Alberta. On February 2, 2016 six new members were sworn into Alberta's Cabinet, and Kathleen Ganley retained the role of Minister of Justice and Solicitor General for the province of Alberta becoming one of the first non-conservatives to be appointed since the early 1960s. The department of Aboriginal Relations was renamed to Indigenous Relations, reflecting the preference of Indigenous communities, with Richard Feehan appointed Minister of Indigenous Relations.

Life and career
Ganley was born in Edmonton and moved to Calgary before she turned two. She has degrees in Psychology and in Philosophy from the University of Calgary. She graduated from the University of Calgary faculty of law  in 2012. As a lawyer, she specialized in labour and employment. She also worked as a clerk in a provincial court. Ganley gave birth to her first child, a daughter named Wren, in November, 2017.

Electoral history

2015 general election

2019 general election

References

Alberta New Democratic Party MLAs
Lawyers in Alberta
Living people
Members of the Executive Council of Alberta
Politicians from Calgary
Politicians from Edmonton
University of Calgary alumni
Women MLAs in Alberta
University of Calgary Faculty of Law alumni
21st-century Canadian politicians
21st-century Canadian women politicians
Women government ministers of Canada
1978 births